Everybody Sing may refer to:

 Everybody, Sing!, 2021 Philippine game show
 Everybody Sing (1938 film), 1938 film directed by Edwin L. Marin
 Everybody Sing (Judy Garland song), 1938 song by Judy Garland

See also 

 Everybody (disambiguation)
 Sing (disambiguation)